The Order of Sukhbaatar (or Order of Suche Bator) is a state decoration of Mongolia, originally instituted on 16 May 1941. It was awarded to Mongolians and foreigners "for special services to defenses, economic and cultural construction of the Mongolian People's Republic, and also for acts of heroism in the struggle against external and internal enemies". It was named after the Mongolian national hero, Damdin Sükhbaatar. It is still conferred today and has been the highest state order since 1992, awarded by the decree of the President of Mongolia.

Order description 
This medal is worn on the left side of the brooch before or at the beginning of other medals. He is also awarded the title of Hero of Mongolia and Hero of Labor.

The number of awards with the order, according to Herfurt, is 1700. Recipients of the Order received a number of civic privileges. Those awarded with the order have the right to free visits to museums, exhibitions, lectures, reports and all other cultural and social events. A payment of money is made by the State Bank.

Records in number of times awarded 

 Marshal Yumjaagiin Tsedenbal (6 times)
 Colonel General Butochiyn Tsog (5 times) 
 Marshal Khorloogiin Choibalsan (3 times)
 Marshal Georgy Zhukov (3 times)

Recipients

People 

 Sergey Akhromeyev
 Anatoly Alexandrov (physicist)
 Natsagiin Bagabandi
 Ivan Bagramyan
 Pavel Batitsky
 Jambyn Batmönkh
 Pavel Batov
 Pavel Belyayev
 Lavrentiy Beria
 Filipp Bobkov
 Leonid Brezhnev
 Josip Broz Tito
 Gonchigiin Bumtsend
 Vasily Chuikov
 Vladimir Dolgikh
 Vladimir Dzhanibekov
 Ivan Fedyuninsky
 Maidarjavyn Ganzorig
 Andrei Getman
 Viktor Gorbatko
 Sergey Gorshkov
 Jügderdemidiin Gürragchaa
 Ho Chi Minh
 Gustáv Husák
 Alexi Ivanov
 Semyon Ivanov
 Henryk Jabłoński
 Wojciech Jaruzelski
 Mikhail Katukov
 Nikita Khrushchev
 Kim Il-sung
 Leonid Kizim
 Dinmukhamed Kunaev
 Ivan Konev
 Vladimir Kovalyonok
 Viktor Kulikov
 Semyon Kurkotkin
 Pavel Kurochkin
 Pavel Kutakhov
 Vladimir Lyakhov
 Ivan Lyudnikov
 Rodion Malinovsky
 Igor Moiseyev
 Andriyan Nikolayev
 Nikolai Ogarkov
 Vasily Petrov (marshal)
 Issa Pliyev
 Alexander Pokryshkin
 Konstantin Rokossovsky
 Nikolai Rukavishnikov
 Viktor Savinykh
 Sergey Sokolov (marshal)
 Souphanouvong
 Joseph Stalin
 Vladimir Sudets
 Valentina Tereshkova
 Gherman Titov
 Yumjaagiin Tsedenbal
 Butochiyn Tsog
 Dmitry Ustinov
 Aleksandr Vasilevsky
 Nikolay Voronov
 Kliment Voroshilov
 Alexei Yepishev
 Todor Zhivkov
 Georgy Zhukov
 Tôn Đức Thắng

Locations 

 Bulgan Province
Kyakhta (Buryatia, Russia)

Public institutions 

 Mongolian Revolutionary Youth League
 Sukhe Bator Mongolian Pioneers Organization (twice)
 Newspaper "Unen" ("Truth") of the Central Committee of the MPRP
 Union of Mongolian Writers
 University of Finance and Economics

Military units/Institutions 

 Military Academy of the General Staff of the Armed Forces of Russia
 112th "Revolutionary Mongolia" Tank Brigade
 National Defense University
Army Newspaper "Ulaan Od" ("Red Star")
Soviet-Mongolian Friendship Society
Lomonosov Moscow State University

References 

Sukhbaatar
Awards established in 1941